Shaik Baksh is a Guyanese politician. He was Guyana's Minister of Education from 2009 to 2020. Mr. Baksh served in the Guyana Government
as Minister of Housing and Water before being appointed Education Minister. He has worked
as a lecturer at the University of Guyana and as an executive in the private sector.

Minister Baksh holds a bachelor's degree in Management from the University of Guyana and an MSc
in Management from the University of London.

In August 2020, Shaik Baksh was appointed Chief Executive Officer of the Guyana Water Incorporated.

Notes and references

Living people
Government ministers of Guyana
University of Guyana alumni
Alumni of the University of London
People's Progressive Party (Guyana) politicians
Year of birth missing (living people)